Daniel Ayala (born 30 December 1995) is a Chilean handball player for BM Usab and the Chilean national team.

He represented Chile at the 2019 World Men's Handball Championship.

References

1995 births
Living people
Chilean male handball players
Pan American Games medalists in handball
Pan American Games silver medalists for Chile
Handball players at the 2019 Pan American Games
Medalists at the 2019 Pan American Games
21st-century Chilean people
20th-century Chilean people